Erik Christopher Daniels (born April 1, 1982) is an American former professional basketball player. He has played for the Sacramento Kings of the NBA, along with the Fayetteville Patriots and the Erie BayHawks of the NBA D-League. He played his college basketball at the University of Kentucky.

College career
After graduating from Princeton High School in Sharonville, Ohio, Daniels went on to the University of Kentucky, where he played his way into the starting lineup his junior and senior year.

Professional career
After going undrafted in the 2004 NBA draft, Daniels was signed by the Kings as a free agent. He got very limited playing time in the 2004-05 NBA season, amassing a mere 13 points and 18 rebounds over the span of 21 games. Daniels was released by the Kings on October 17, 2005, and signed with the D-League's Fayetteville Patriots.

In the 2006–2007 season he played with the Angelico Biella of the Italian Serie A league, and in the summer of 2007 he was signed by Lottomatica Roma for the next two seasons. He was selected with the 7th pick in the first round of the 2008 NBA D-League Draft by the Erie BayHawks.  On February 11, 2009, Daniels would become the first BayHawk selected to the NBA D-League All-Star game.  He would be named an alternate on the All-Star game's blue team.

On March 19, 2010 he joined Hapoel Gilboa Galil Elyon from the Israeli Basketball Super League, with whom he won the 2010 championship.

On November 7, 2013 Erik returned to Ukrainian Superleague, having signed a contract with BC Odessa.

On November 29, 2014 he signed with Argentinian team Quimsa.

References

External links
NBA.com Profile
Erik Daniels player statistics @ cbs.sportsline.com
NBA D-League Stats @ basketball-reference.com

1982 births
Living people
African-American basketball players
American expatriate basketball people in Croatia
American expatriate basketball people in Israel
American expatriate basketball people in Italy
American expatriate basketball people in Spain
American expatriate basketball people in Ukraine
Basketball players from Cincinnati
BC Azovmash players
BC Odesa players
CB Girona players
Erie BayHawks (2008–2017) players
Fayetteville Patriots players
Hapoel Gilboa Galil Elyon players
Israeli Basketball Premier League players
Kentucky Wildcats men's basketball players
KK Zagreb players
Liga ACB players
Pallacanestro Biella players
Pallacanestro Virtus Roma players
Quimsa basketball players
Sacramento Kings players
Small forwards
Undrafted National Basketball Association players
American men's basketball players
21st-century African-American sportspeople
20th-century African-American people